LIFL may refer to: 
Laboratoire d'Informatique Fondamentale de Lille, a computer science research laboratory of Lille University of Science and Technology.